Joseph Thomas Porcaro (April 29, 1930 – July 6, 2020) was an American jazz drummer.

Biography

Personal life

The Porcaro family is, on the paternal side, originally from San Luca, an Aspromonte village in the province of Reggio Calabria. Joe Porcaro, a well-known jazz drummer and percussionist, born in Hartford, Connecticut to Mike, an Italian immigrant from San Luca, Calabria, and a mother from Caserta, Campania. The couple had moved to the US in the early twentieth century. Grandfather Mike was himself a percussionist who played with numerous Italian bands based in the U.S., and it is with him that the family musical tradition began, passed on to his son Joe and then to his three famous grandchildren. Joe's three sons were in the rock band Toto: drummer Jeff (1954–1992); bassist Mike (1955–2015); and keyboardist Steve (b. 1957), who still is a session musician and programmer.  He also has a daughter, Joleen Porcaro Duddy (actress and designer), whose children, Chase and Paige Duddy, formed the electronic duo XYLO.

Career

Porcaro recorded with Natalie Cole, Don Ellis, Stan Getz, Freddie Hubbard, Gladys Knight, Madonna, The Monkees, Gerry Mulligan, Pink Floyd, Howard Roberts, Frank Sinatra, Nancy Sinatra, and Sarah Vaughan. He performed film scores with James Newton Howard, John Williams, Jerry Goldsmith, James Horner, Danny Elfman, John Frizzell and his son Steve Porcaro. With educator and drummer Ralph Humphrey, he was one of the founders of the Los Angeles Music Academy (LAMA) in Pasadena, California, which is now called the Los Angeles College of Music (LACM). Porcaro led a group with Emil Richards, a native of Hartford who played vibraphone and collected percussion instruments from around the world.

Death 
Porcaro died at the age of 90 in Thousand Oaks, California on July 6, 2020. His death was ruled to be of natural causes.

Discography

As leader
 2002 Better Off Back Then

As sideman

With Rosemary Clooney
 1992 Girl Singer
 1994 Still on the Road
 1995 Demi-Centennial
 1996 Dedicated to Nelson
 1997 Mothers & Daughters
 2002 Out of This World

With Lalo Schifrin
 The Fox (MGM, 1968)
 There's a Whole Lalo Schifrin Goin' On (Dot, 1968)
 Kelly's Heroes (MGM, 1970)
 Rock Requiem (Verve, 1971)
 Enter the Dragon (Warner Bros., 1973)

With others
 1962 Blues on the Other Side, Mike Mainieri (Argo) 
 1967 Sugar, Nancy Sinatra
 1968 California Soul, Gerald Wilson
 1969 Instant Replay, The Monkees
 1970 The American Dream, Emitt Rhodes
 1971 Electronic Progress, Harvey Mandel
 1971 The Age of Steam, Gerry Mulligan
 1974 150 MPH, Louie Bellson
 1975 Home Plate, Bonnie Raitt
 1975 Mirrors, Peggy Lee
 1975 Touch, John Klemmer
 1976 Barefoot Ballet, John Klemmer
 1976 Silk Degrees, Boz Scaggs
 1977 Southern Nights, Glen Campbell
 1977 Making a Good Thing Better, Olivia Newton-John
 1978 Change of Heart, Eric Carmen
 1978 Cheryl Lynn, Cheryl Lynn
 1979 Raw Silk, Randy Crawford
 1979 Yvonne, Yvonne Elliman
 1979 Headlines, Paul Anka
 1979 Children of the World, Stan Getz
 1981 Big Mouth, Milt Jackson
 1981 Messina, Jim Messina
 1981 Songs of The Beatles, Sarah Vaughan
 1981 Rit, Lee Ritenour
 1982 Donna Summer, Donna Summer
 1982 Ride Like the Wind, Freddie Hubbard
 1984 Emotion, Barbra Streisand
 1987 Freedom at Midnight, David Benoit
 1988 Reunion, Mel Tormé
 1989 Like a Prayer, Madonna
 1992 Brasileiro, Sergio Mendes
 1993 Devotion, Warren Hill
 1993 When My Heart Finds Christmas, Harry Connick Jr.
 1993 Windows, Roger Kellaway
 1994 Dreams in Motion, Felix Cavaliere
 1994 Richard Marx, Richard Marx
 1996 Luntana, Emil Richards
 1996 Organic, Joe Cocker
 1997 Conspiracy Theory, Carter Burwell
 1997 Tribute to Jeff Porcaro, David Garfield
 2005 Christmas Songs, Diana Krall

References

External links
 (archived 2011)
 

1930 births
2020 deaths
Musicians from Hartford, Connecticut
American jazz drummers
American people of Italian descent
American jazz percussionists
Musicians from Los Angeles
American session musicians
Toto (band)
American jazz vibraphonists
20th-century American drummers
American male drummers
American male jazz musicians